The Florida Memorial Lions are the athletic teams that represent Florida Memorial University, located in Miami Gardens, Florida, in intercollegiate sports as a member of the National Association of Intercollegiate Athletics (NAIA), primarily competing in the Sun Conference (formerly known as the Florida Sun Conference (FSC) until after the 2007–08 school year) since the 1990–91 academic year. Its football program began competing in the Mid-South Conference (MSC) from the 2020 to 2021 fall seasons.

Varsity teams
Florida Memorial competes in 13 intercollegiate varsity sports: Men's sports include baseball, basketball, football, soccer and track & field; while women's sports include basketball, beach volleyball, flag football, soccer, softball, track & field and volleyball; and co-ed sports include cheerleading.

Football
The last football game played by the Lions was a 14–8 win over Albany State in 1958. The University played under the name Florida Normal and Industrial Institute. They competed in the Southeastern Athletic Conference. From 1945 to 1958 the team finished with an all-time record of 41 wins, 25 loses and six ties with a break in the 1949 season. The football program was re-instated in 2020, after a 62 year hiatus. On 10/23/2021, The Lions won their first game against Union College 41-17.

References

External links